Deutsche Post is a German postal service and international courier service company.

Deutsche Post may also refer to:

 Deutsche Post (brand), branded domestic mail services of Deutsche Post
 Deutsche Post of the GDR, state-owned postal and telecommunications monopoly of the German Democratic Republic, 1949–1990
 Die Deutsche Post, first German-language newspaper in Australia, a predecessor of Australische Zeitung

See also
 Reichspost, the official German postal authority prior to 1946
 Deutsche Bundespost, the official post authority in the Federal Republic of Germany from 1949 to 1995
 Postage stamps and postal history of Germany as established by the Allies in the American, British, and Russian occupation zones in Germany 1946–1949